Kariapatti taluk is a taluk of Virudhunagar district of the Indian state of Tamil Nadu. The headquarters of the taluk is the town of Kariapatti.

Demographics
According to the 2011 census, the taluk of Kariapatti had a population of 105,329 with 52,875 males and 52,454 females. There were 992 women for every 1,000 men. The taluk had a literacy rate of 68.46%. Child population in the age group below 6 years were 5,736 Males and 5,513 Females.

References 

Taluks of Virudhunagar district